Goeldi's antbird (Akletos goeldii) is a species of bird in the family Thamnophilidae. It is found in Bolivia, Brazil and Peru. Its natural habitat is subtropical or tropical moist lowland forests.

Goeldi's antbird was previously placed in the genus Myrmeciza. A molecular phylogenetic study published in 2013 found that Myrmeciza, as then defined, was polyphyletic. In the resulting rearrangement to create monophyletic genera this species was moved to the resurrected genus Akletos which had been introduced by the Polish ornithologist Andrzej Dunajewski in 1948.

References

Goeldi's antbird
Birds of the Peruvian Amazon
Birds of the Bolivian Amazon
Goeldi's antbird
Goeldi's antbird
Taxonomy articles created by Polbot
Taxobox binomials not recognized by IUCN